The Smartbomb EP is the first studio release by Canadian Cyberpunk/Industrial metal band Left Spine Down. The album was released on June 26, 2007 via the band's website and online music retailers such as iTunes and Amazon.com.

Track listing

References

External links
Left Spine Down Official Site
Smartbomb EP on iTunes
Smartbomb EP on Amazon MP3 Store
 Mindphaser B review
 Side-Line review|

2007 EPs
Left Spine Down albums